Striegistal is a municipality in the district of Mittelsachsen, in Saxony, Germany. In 1994, the unification of the former municipalities of Berbersdorf, Goßberg, Mobendorf and Pappendorf as part of the regional administrative reform, created the municipality of Striegistal. In 2008 it absorbed the former municipality Tiefenbach. It received its name from the two rivers that flow through the community, the Little Striegis and the Big Striegis.

Sons and daughters of the community 

 David Schirmer (1623-1686), lyricist of the baroque period. 
 Wolfgang Schindler (1929-1991), classical archaeologist
 Martin Kröger (1894-1980), chemist and professor at the University of Leipzig

References 

Mittelsachsen